Long Live Love is the fourth studio album by British-Australian singer Olivia Newton-John, released in June 1974 by EMI Records.

Singles
The title track was released in March 1974. Newton-John performed it at the 1974 Eurovision Song Contest when she represented the UK. Along with the title track, five other tracks from the LP had been the six shortlisted songs for the UK selection for Eurovision, broadcast as A Song for Europe, 1974. The song that placed second, "Angel Eyes", was also released as the B-side of the "Long Live Love" single. (The other four songs were "Someday", "Loving You Ain't Easy", "Have Love, Will Travel", and "Hands Across the Sea".)

Track listing

Side one
"Free the People" (Barbara Keith) – 3:20
"Angel Eyes" (Tony Macaulay, Keith Potger) – 2:45
"Country Girl" (Alan Hawkshaw, Peter Gosling) – 3:49
"Someday" (Gary Benson, David Mindel) – 2:57
"God Only Knows" (Brian Wilson, Tony Asher) – 2:48
"Loving You Ain't Easy" (Stuart Leathwood, Bob Saker, Gary Sulsh) – 2:47

Side two
"Home Ain't Home Anymore" (John Farrar, Peter Robinson) – 2:52
"Have Love, Will Travel" (Roger Greenaway, Geoff Stephens) – 2:45
"I Honestly Love You" (Peter Allen, Jeff Barry) – 3:38
"Hands Across the Sea" (Ben Findon, Geoff Wilkins) – 2:55
"The River's Too Wide" (Bob Morrison) – 3:16
"Long Live Love" (Valerie Avon, Harold Spiro) – 2:46

Japanese bonus tracks
"Mon Amour, Mon Impossible Amour" – 3:40
"Long Live Love" (German version) – 2:48

Personnel
John Farrar, Nick Ingman, Alan Hawkshaw, Brian Bennett - arrangements
John Kelly - photography

Charts

References

1974 albums
Olivia Newton-John albums
Albums produced by Bruce Welch
Albums produced by John Farrar
EMI Records albums